is a railway station on the Sekihoku Main Line in Engaru, Monbetsu District, Hokkaido, Japan, operated by Hokkaido Railway Company (JR Hokkaido).

Lines
Shirataki Station is served by the Sekihoku Main Line, and is numbered "A45".

Adjacent stations

History
The station opened on 12 August 1929. With the privatization of Japanese National Railways (JNR) on 1 April 1987, the station came under the control of JR Hokkaido.

See also
 List of railway stations in Japan

References

Railway stations in Hokkaido Prefecture
Stations of Hokkaido Railway Company
Railway stations in Japan opened in 1929